Public Archaeology is a quarterly peer-reviewed academic journal established in 2000, edited by Tim Schadla-Hall and published by Maney Publishing. It covers the relationships between practical archaeology, archaeological theory and cultural heritage management models, and the involvement of wider civic, governmental, and community concerns.

The journal's creation had been initiated and overseen by Peter Ucko after he took over as director of the UCL Institute of Archaeology.

References

External links 

Archaeology journals
English-language journals
Publications established in 2000
Public archaeology
Taylor & Francis academic journals